Prince of Jinan may refer to:

Princes of Jinan Commandery during the Han dynasty
Liu Piguang (died 154 BC)
Emperor Fei of Northern Qi (545–561), known as the Prince of Jinan after his deposition
Grand Prince of Jinan (1354–1394), Taejo of Joseon's son